Andy Goddard (born 1968) is a Welsh director and screenwriter, best known for writing and directing his feature debut Set Fire to the Stars (2014) and directing and co-producing his second feature A Kind of Murder (2016). Goddard has also directed five episodes of the ITV period drama series Downton Abbey.

Life and career
Goddard was born in Pembroke Dock, Wales and grew up on the Isle of Skye in Scotland. He later studied film, photography and television at Napier University in Edinburgh.

Goddard's debut short Little Sisters was nominated for a BAFTA Award and won the Gold Hugo Award for Best Narrative Short Film at the 34th Chicago International Film Festival. The film went on to win the DM Davies Award at the Welsh International Film Festival and the Grand Prix in European Competition at Festival du film de Vendôme.

His television work includes episodes of The Bill, Once Upon a Time, Torchwood, Law & Order: UK, Downton Abbey, and Doctor Who. In 2014, Goddard collaborated with actor Celyn Jones on Set Fire to the Stars, a feature-length film depicting Dylan Thomas' first trip to America in 1950. Jones portrayed the Welsh poet, opposite Elijah Wood, from a screenplay he co-wrote with Goddard. The film premiered at the 68th Edinburgh International Film Festival, and Goddard and Jones were nominated for the BAFTA Cymru Award for Best Screenwriting. He has directed the psychological thriller film A Kind of Murder, starring Patrick Wilson and Jessica Biel, an adaptation of the Patricia Highsmith novel The Blunderer.

Filmography

Awards and nominations

References

External links
 

1968 births
British television directors
British film directors
British screenwriters
Living people
People from Pembroke Dock